Ventress may refer to:

Ventress, Louisiana, a town in the United States
Asajj Ventress, a fictional character in Star Wars
PC Alf Ventress, a character in Heartbeat (UK TV series)